Crawford Lake is a freshwater lake located in the Alpine Lakes Wilderness, at the western ridge of Iron Cap Mountain in King County, Washington. The lake is nestled on a set of prominent valleys and peaks and produces Crawford Creek which flows as one of many tributaries of the Middle Fork Foss River. A short distance towards the north are Chetwoot Lake, Angeline Lake and the Necklace Valley Lakes. Self-issued Alpine Lake Wilderness permit required for transit within the Necklace Valley area.

Geography
Crawford Lake replicates the geology of the ridges of Iron Cap Mountain and others that surround it with Permian volcanic rocks, Jurassic/Crustaceous sedimentary and volcanic rocks, with Tertiary granites and alluvium of recent age. The ridges may have iode gold, lead-zinc and silver known as Iron Cap and Tooker-Leshud deposits.

The Crawford Lake area is notorious for a prominent col the rises at the southwestern shores of the lake.

See also 
 List of lakes of the Alpine Lakes Wilderness

References 

Lakes of King County, Washington
Lakes of the Alpine Lakes Wilderness
Okanogan National Forest